Gandhi Fellowship is a two-year residential educational leadership program offered by Piramal School of leadership and Kaivalya Education Foundation. The program involves district and state-level bodies across India to enhance the public education system.

History
The fellowship program was first started in 2008 at jhunjhunu and Churu districts of Rajasthan. Aditya Natraj is the CEO and Founder of the program.

Vision
Gandhi Fellowship follows the ideology of "be the change that you wish to see in the world" by Mahatma Gandhi. The program was launched with an idea to change one million lives in India by 2025.

References

Social work organizations
Organisations based in India
Educational programs by nation
Education in India
Mahatma Gandhi